Craig Wasson (born March 15, 1954) is an American actor. He made his film debut in Rollercoaster (1977). He is best known for his roles as Jake Scully in Brian DePalma's Body Double (1984), and Neil Gordon in Chuck Russell's A Nightmare on Elm Street 3: Dream Warriors (1987). For his role as Danilo Prozor in Arthur Penn's Four Friends (1981), he was nominated for a Golden Globe Award.

Early life 
Wasson was born March 15, 1954, in Ontario, Oregon.

Career 
Wasson's first feature film was the 1977 suspense thriller Rollercoaster. In 1978, he appeared in two films about the Vietnam war: first as a private in The Boys in Company C and then as a corporal in Go Tell the Spartans. He also wrote and sang the haunting folk song "Here I Am (In Vietnam)", which served as the theme song for The Boys in Company C.

Craig starred in the short-lived 1980 TV series Skag. In 1981, he played Don Wanderley, a junior English professor in the film Ghost Story, in which his character has a torrid sexual relationship with a mysterious woman he later realizes is a ghost seeking vengeance. In 1982, he was nominated for the Golden Globe Award for New Star of the Year - Actor for his performance in Four Friends. He later starred as Jake Scully in the 1984 Brian De Palma suspense movie Body Double. His other big role was as Dr. Neil Gordon in the hit 1987 horror film A Nightmare on Elm Street 3: Dream Warriors. He starred alongside Heather Langenkamp, Robert Englund, Patricia Arquette, and Laurence Fishburne. In 1989, Wasson starred as James Madison in A More Perfect Union: America Becomes a Nation. His most recent movie roles are in Akeelah and the Bee and Sasquatch Mountain, both released in 2006.

Wasson was featured as Doug Ebert in the soap opera One Life to Live in 1991. He has made guest appearances in a number of series, including The Bob Newhart Show, Phyllis, Skag, For Jenny with Love, Murder, She Wrote, M*A*S*H (TV series), Hart to Hart, Walker, Texas Ranger, Profiler, The Practice, Seven Days, The Secrets of Isis, and Star Trek: Deep Space Nine. He played the barber in the music video for Cut Your Hair by Pavement.

Wasson is also a prolific narrator for audio books, having narrated Stephen King's 2011 novel 11/22/63, and other books by Stephen King, as well as books by James Ellroy and John Grisham.

Filmography

Phyllis, Season 2, reoccurring (1976-1977)
Rollercoaster (1977) - Hippie Boy
The Boys in Company C (1978) - Dave Bisbee
Go Tell the Spartans (1978) - Cpl. Stephen Courcey
The Outsider (1980) - Michael Flaherty
Carny (1980) - Mickey
Schizoid (1980) - Doug
Nights at O'Rear's (1980) - Max Corley
Four Friends (1981) - Danilo Prozor
Ghost Story (1981) - Don / David
Second Thoughts (1983) - Will
M*A*S*H Season 11 (1983) Episode 14: 'Give and Take '  Private Kurland
Body Double (1984) - Jake Scully
Zoo Ship (1985) - (voice)
The Men's Club (1986) - Paul
Tales from the Darkside (1986, "The Geezenstacks") - Sam Hummel
A Nightmare on Elm Street 3: Dream Warriors (1987) - Dr. Neil Gordon
Bum Rap (1988) - Paul Colson
Bush Shrink (1988) - Dr. Martin Cypher
A More Perfect Union (1989) - James Madison
Midnight Fear (1991) - Paul
Malcolm X (1992) - TV Host
Strapped (1993) - Ben
Dr. Quinn Medicine Woman (1994) - Julius Hoffman
Murder, She Wrote (1994) - Hank Walden, Leslie's Father
Trapped in Space (1995) - Palmer
I Shot a Man in Vegas (1995) - Radio Caller (voice)
Star Trek Deep Space Nine S4 E19: "Hard Time" (1996) - Ee'char
The Tomorrow Man (1996) - Dr. Galloway
Deep Family Secrets (1997) - Jack Winters
Back to Even (1998) - Sasso
Tian shang ren jian (1998) - Adam Peers
Velocity Trap (1999) - John Dawson, RMC Corp.
The Pornographer (1999) - Spano
The Last Best Sunday (1999) - Deputy Sheriff Bennett
The Storytellers (1999) - Larry Moore
Under Pressure (2000) - Elgin Bates
Danny and Max (2000) - Ralph
Epoch (2001) - Hudson
New Alcatraz (2001) - Warden Fred Riley
Ghost Rock (2003) - Cherokee Bill
Puerto Vallarta Squeeze (2004) - Danny Pastor
Tracks (2005)
Akeelah and the Bee (2006) - Ted Saunders
Sasquatch Mountain (2006) - Travis Cralle

References

External links

1954 births
American male film actors
American male soap opera actors
American male television actors
Living people
People from Ontario, Oregon
Male actors from Oregon
20th-century American male actors
21st-century American male actors